Stigmatophora leacrita is a moth in the subfamily Arctiinae. It was described by Swinhoe in 1894. It is found in the Russian Far East (Primorye), China, Korea and Japan.

References

Moths described in 1894
Lithosiini
Moths of Asia